2 Minutes of Fame is a 2020 American drama-comedy film directed by Leslie Small and starring Jay Pharoah and Katt Williams.

Plot
2 Minutes of Fame is about an aspiring stand-up comedian who becomes a viral online sensation. He moves to Los Angeles hoping to become a film star and have a movie career. He has a wife who watches him follow his dream while taking care of his house and children.

Cast
Jay Pharoah as Deandre
Katt Williams as Marques
Keke Palmer as Sky
RonReaco Lee as Eddie
Deon Cole as Nico

Reception

According to CultureMix, the movie, "has an endearing sweetness at the core of its raunchy humor. It works best when it focuses on the competitive world of stand-up comedy rather than the relationship/family problems of the protagonist."

References

External links
 
 

American comedy films
2020 comedy films
2020s English-language films
Films directed by Leslie Small
2020s American films